Vanessa samani is a butterfly of the family Nymphalidae found on Sumatra, where it has been recorded from Mount Kerinci and the Karo Mountains.

References

Butterflies described in 1895
samani